"El Último Beso" is a song by Argentine singer Tini and Argentine rapper Tiago PZK. It was released on September 15, 2022 by Hollywood Records and 5020 Records as the eight single from Tini's upcoming fourth studio album, Cupido (2023). The song was written by two singers alongside Elena Rose, Duki and its producers Richi López, Andrés Torres and Mauricio Rengifo.

Background and release 
Tini announced the song at the end of July 2022 through her social networks, and added that she is very excited about this collaboration and can't wait for people to hear this song and watch the music video. Later, both singers published some behind-the-scenes pictures of a video clip  via their Instagram stories. Tigao PZK also told that "It was leaked. There’s something Tini coming up with”, a few days before the song came out.

During an interwiev Tini shared: “I love his talent from the first time I heard it, I always wanted to share music with him, so I'm very happy that the time has come and you can finally listen to this song that we have saved for so long. I hope you enjoy it a lot and The day will come soon when we can meet at a show and sing it." Speaking abouth his part Tiago PZK said: “It's a pleasure to make a song with one of the most professional and well-dressed women in my country, the song is from the heart and has a very real message about ties."

Composition 
"El Último Beso" is a primary urban-pop song with punk rock influences.  The song was written by Tini, Tiago PKZ alongside Elena Rose, Duki, Richi López, Andrés Torres and Mauricio Rengifo, while the later three also produced the song. It lasts for a duration of three minutes and seventeen seconds. The song is written in the key of B♭ major, with a moderately fast tempo of 113 beats per minute.

Music video 
The music video was released alongside the song on Tini's YouTube channel. It was directed by Argentine director Diego Peskins. The music video follows the two as they play a couple whose relationship is on the brink of failure. The video begins with the two together with montages of them getting tattoos. The relationship develops throughout the video as the artists bring the lyrics to life with emotionally moving renditions.

Charts

Certifications

References

2022 singles
2022 songs
Tini (singer) songs
Hollywood Records singles
Songs written by Elena Rose
Songs written by Andrés Torres (producer)
Songs written by Mauricio Rengifo
Song recordings produced by Andrés Torres (producer)
Punk rock songs
Latin rock songs
Spanish-language songs